Alec Leonce (born 19 April 1962) is a British bobsledder. He competed in the two man and the four man events at the 1988 Winter Olympics.

References

External links
 

1962 births
Living people
British male bobsledders
Olympic bobsledders of Great Britain
Bobsledders at the 1988 Winter Olympics
Sportspeople from London